Gitane–Campagnolo was a French professional cycling team that existed from 1969 to 1977. Its main sponsor was the French bicycle manufacturer Gitane.

History 

The Sonolor team was created for the 1969 season after the Pelforth–Sauvage–Lejeune team ended in 1968. In 1974, the Gitane–Frigécrème team of directeur sportif Andre Desvrages was merged into the team creating Sonolor–Gitane. The team was called Gitane–Campagnolo from 1975–1977 and in 1975 signed 1971 French amateur champion Bernard Hinault. During this time the team was directed by Stablinski, but Cyrille Guimard was becoming involved as well as Maurice Champion.

Guimard took over as main directeur sportif in 1976 and directed Van Impe to success in the 1976 Tour de France. Van Impe left at the end of 1976 and Hinault was designated captain for stage races. Even though Hinault won the Critérium du Dauphiné Libéré in 1977 in front of Bernard Thévenet and Lucien Van Impe, he did not start the Tour de France.

After Renault auto group purchased Gitane, Renault became the main sponsor of the team making the Renault–Elf–Gitane team.

Major wins 
Tour de France General classification 1976
Australian National Road Race Championships 1976
Belgian National Road Race Championships 1975
French National Cyclo Cross Championships 1976
Dutch National Road Race Championships 1973
Liège–Bastogne–Liège 1977
Gent–Wevelgem 1977
GP Ouest-France 1973, 1974, 1976, 1977
Critérium du Dauphiné Libéré General classification 1977
Circuit Cycliste de la Sarthe 1975
Paris–Camembert 1975, 1976
Grand Prix de Denain 1974, 1977
Grand Prix de Fourmies 1974
Critérium International 1977

References

External links 

Defunct cycling teams based in France
Cycling teams based in France
1969 establishments in France
1977 disestablishments in France
Cycling teams established in 1969
Cycling teams disestablished in 1977